The 2004 Czech Indoor Open Open was a men's tennis tournament played on indoor hard courts in Průhonice , Czech Republic, and was part of the 2004 ATP Challenger Series.

This was the second edition of the event and was held from 23 to 28 November 2004.

Martin Štěpánek and  Igor Zelenay were the previous edition winners. The first lost in semifinals.

Lukáš Dlouhý and Igor Zelenay won the title, defeating Jan Minář and Jaroslav Pospíšil 6–3, 3–6, 7–6(7–5)  in the final.

Igor Zelenay successfully defended the title.

Seeds

Draw

References
Qualifying Draw

Main Draw

Draws on ITF Site

Czech Indoor Open